Inzensky District  is an administrative and municipal district (raion), one of the twenty-one in Ulyanovsk Oblast, Russia. It is located in the west of the oblast. The area of the district is  Its administrative center is the town of Inza. Population: 33,877 (2010 Census);  The population of Inza accounts for 55.5% of the district's total population.

References

Notes

Sources

Districts of Ulyanovsk Oblast